Caldwell Creek is a stream in Wayne County in the U.S. state of Missouri. It is a tributary of the St. Francis River.

The confluence is about six miles south of Greenville.

Caldwell Creek has the name of James Caldwell, a pioneer citizen.

See also
List of rivers of Missouri

References

Rivers of Wayne County, Missouri
Rivers of Missouri